The modified transverse Mercator (MTM) coordinate system is a metric grid-based method of specifying locations, similar to the Universal Transverse Mercator coordinate system. MTM uses a transverse Mercator projection with zones spaced 3° of longitude apart.

The coordinate system is used in Eastern Canada.

Geographic coordinate systems